Recovered-memory therapy (RMT) is a catch-all term for a controversial and scientifically discredited form of psychotherapy that critics say utilizes one or more unproven therapeutic techniques (such as psychoanalysis, hypnosis,  journaling, past life regression, guided imagery, and the use of sodium amytal interviews) to purportedly help patients recall previously forgotten memories. Proponents of recovered memory therapy claim, contrary to evidence that traumatic memories can be buried in the subconscious and thereby affect current behavior, and that these memories can be recovered through the use of RMT techniques. RMT is not recommended by mainstream ethical and professional mental health associations.

Terminology 
The term false-memory syndrome was coined between 1992 and 1993 by psychologists and sociologists associated with the False Memory Syndrome Foundation, an organization which advocates on behalf of individuals who claim to have been falsely accused of perpetrating child sexual abuse.  These researchers argue that RMT can result in patients recalling instances of sexual abuse from their childhood which had not actually occurred. While not a therapeutic technique in and of itself, practitioners of RMT generally utilize methods (such as hypnosis, age regression, guided visualization, and/or the use of substances such as sodium amytal) that are known to support the creation of false memories.  A 1994 survey of 1000 therapists by Michael D. Yapko found that 19% of the therapists knew of a case in which a client's memory had been suggested by therapy but was in fact false. An inquiry by the Australian government into the practice found little support for or use of memory recovery therapies among health professionals, and warned that professionals had to be trained to avoid the creation of false memories.  A 2018 survey found that although 5% of a U.S. public sample reported recovering memories of abuse during therapy (abuse they reported having no previous memory of), none of them used the terminology "recovered memory therapy"—instead those recovering memories reported using a variety of other therapy types (e.g., attachment therapy, Emotional Freedom Techniques, etc.).

Research 
A range of studies have concluded that at least 10% of physical and sexual abuse victims forget the abuse. The rate of delayed recall of many forms of traumatic experiences (including natural disasters, kidnapping, torture and more) averages among studies at approximately 15%, with the highest rates resulting from child sexual abuse, military combat, and witnessing a family member murdered. The rate of recall of previously forgotten traumatic events was shown by Elliot and Briere (1996) to be unaffected by whether or not the victim had a history of being in psychotherapy. Linda Meyer Williams, who interviewed 129 adult women who were treated for verified sexual abuse at a hospital as children between the ages of 12 months to 10 years, found that among women with confirmed histories of sexual abuse, approximately 38% did not recall the reported incident on file at the hospital 17 years later, especially when it was perpetrated by someone familiar to them. This study is routinely cited as evidence of repression, however 88% of women interviewed said they had been molested, despite not reporting the specific incident on file—a figure which suggests the opposite of the repression theory. Additionally, this study was conducted using general interviews and relied on the women interviewed to bring up the specific incident that had led them to be hospitalized as children unprompted, meaning if a participant did not bring up the specific incident on file as part of the general interview, this was reported as indicative of repression of the memory. Since the interviewees included victims who were infants at the time, it is unlikely that these specific participants would remember the event. Hopper cites several studies of corroborated abuse in which some abuse victims will have intervals of complete or partial amnesia for their abuse.

A 1996 interview survey of 711 women reported that forgetting and later remembering childhood sexual abuse is not uncommon; more than a quarter of the respondents who reported abuse also reported forgetting the abuse for some period of time and then recalling it on their own. Of those who reported abuse, less than 2% reported that the recall of the abuse was assisted by a therapist or other professional.

A review article on potentially harmful therapies listed RMT as a treatment that will probably produce harm in some who receive it. Richard Ofshe, a member of the advisory board to the FMSF, describes the practice of "recovering" memories as fraudulent and dangerous.

Studies by Elizabeth Loftus and others have concluded that it is possible to produce false memories of childhood incidents. The experiments involved manipulating subjects into believing that they had some fictitious experience in childhood, such as being lost in a shopping mall at age 6. This involved using a suggestive technique called "familial informant false narrative procedure," in which the experimenter claims the validity of the false event is supported by a family member of the subject. The study has been used to support the theory that false memories of traumatic sexual abuse can be implanted in a patient by therapists. Critics of these studies argue that the techniques do not resemble any approved or mainstream treatment modality, and there are criticisms that the implanted events used are not emotionally comparable to sexual abuse. Critics contend that Loftus's conclusions overreach the evidence. Loftus has rebutted these criticisms.

Some patients later retract memories they had previously believed to be recovered. While false or contrived memories are possible reasons for such retractions, other explanations suggested for the retraction of allegations of abuse made by children and adults include guilt, a feeling of obligation to protect their family and a reaction to familial stress rather than a genuine belief that their memories are false. The number of retractions is reported to be small compared to the actual number of child sexual abuse allegations made based on recovered memories.

A study at the Dissociative Disorders and Trauma Program of the McLean Hospital concluded that recovered memories are mostly unconnected to psychotherapeutic treatment and that memories are often corroborated by independent evidence, often appearing while home or with family and friends, with suggestion being generally denied as a factor in recovering memories. Very few participants were in therapy during their first memory recovery and a majority of participants in this study found strong corroboration of their recovered memories.

A 2018 US study is the largest study known that surveys the general public about memory recovery in therapy. The study was presented to participants aged 50 years or older as a "Life Experience" survey and found that 8% of the 2,326 adults had reported seeing therapists, mostly starting in the 1990s, that discussed the possibility of repressed memories of abuse. 4% of adults had reported recovering memories of abuse in therapy for which they had no previous memory. Recovered memories of abuse were associated with most therapy types.

Professional guidelines 
There are several individuals and groups that have published guidelines, criticisms or cautions about recovered memory therapy and techniques to stimulate recall:
 In the Brandon Report, a set of training, practice, research and professional development recommendations, the United Kingdom's Royal College of Psychiatrists advised psychiatrists to avoid use of RMT or any "memory recovery techniques", citing a lack of evidence to support the accuracy of memories recovered in this way.
 In 2004, the government of the Health Council of the Netherlands issued a report in response to inquiries from professionals regarding RMT and memories of traumatic child sexual abuse. The Health Council stated that while traumatic childhood experiences were major risk factors for psychological problems in adulthood, the fact that most traumatic memories are well-remembered but can be forgotten or become inaccessible though the influence of specific circumstances precludes a simple description of the relationship between memory and trauma. The report also notes that memories can be confabulated, re-interpreted and even apparently vivid or dramatic memories can be false, a risk that is increased when therapists use suggestive techniques, attempt to link symptoms to past trauma, with certain patients and through the use of methods to stimulate memories.
 The Australian Hypnotherapists Association (AHA) issued a similar statement, for contexts where false memories of child sexual abuse may arise. The AHA acknowledges that child sexual abuse is serious, damaging and at least some memories are genuine, while cautioning that some questioning techniques and interventions may lead to illusory memories leading to false beliefs about abuse.
 The Canadian Psychological Association has issued guidelines for psychologists addressing recovered memories. Psychologists are urged to be aware of their limitations in knowledge and training regarding memory, trauma and development and "that there is no constellation of symptoms which is diagnostic of child sexual abuse". The guidelines also urge caution and awareness of the benefits and limitations of "relaxation, hypnosis, guided imagery, free associations, inner child exercises, age regression, body memory interpretation, body massage, dream interpretation, and the use of projective techniques" and special caution regarding any legal involvement of memories, abuse and therapy.

Legal issues 

In Ramona v. Isabella, Gary Ramona sued his daughter's therapist for implanting false memories of his abuse of her.  In the first case putting recovered memory therapy, itself, on trial, he eventually was awarded $500,000 in 1994.

Discussing RMT in the New South Wales Parliament in 1995, the state Minister for Health, Andrew Refshauge – a medical practitioner – stated that the general issue of admissibility of evidence based on recovered memories was one for the Attorney General. In 2004 Australian Counselling Association issued a draft position statement regarding recovered memories in which it informed its membership of possible legal difficulties if they affirm accusations as true based solely upon discussion of a patient's recovered memories, without adequate corroborating evidence.

A degree of controversy does remain within legal circles, with some holding the view that therapists and courts should consider repressed memories the same as they consider regular memories. Three relevant studies state that repressed memories are "no more and no less accurate than continuous memories."

Recovered memory therapy was an issue in the criminal trials of some Catholic priests accused of fondling or sexually assaulting juvenile-turned-adult parishioners.

In a 2017 criminal case in Canada, a Nova Scotian clergyman, the Reverend Brent Hawkes, was acquitted in a case involving recovered memories of alleged historical sexual abuse when Justice Alan Tufts described in his ruling that the complainant's method of re-constructing his memory of alleged events after joining a men's group and hearing similar accounts from other "survivors" his evidence could not be reliable.

Several court cases awarded multimillion-dollar verdicts against Minnesota psychiatrist Diane Bay Humenansky, who used hypnosis and other suggestive techniques associated with RMT, resulting in accusations by several patients against family members that were later found to be false.

In 1999 the Netherlands Board of Prosecutors General formed The National Expert Group on Special Sexual Matters, in Dutch - Landelijke Expertisegroep Bijzondere Zedenzaken (LEBZ). LEBZ consists of a multidisciplinary group of experts of whom investigating police officers and prosecutors are mandated to consult before considering arresting or prosecuting a person accused of sexual crimes involving repressed memories or recovered memory therapy. The LEBZ released a report for the period of 2003 - 2007 stating that 90% of the cases they consulted on were stopped due to their recommendations that the allegations were not based on reliable evidence.

See also 
 Amnesia
 Emotion and memory
 Gaslighting
 Memory inhibition
 Psychological trauma
 Satanic ritual abuse
 Spectral evidence

References

Further reading 
 
 Ofshe, Richard and Watters, Ethan. Making Monsters: False Memories, Psychotherapy, And Sexual Hysteria. University of California Press; Reprint edition, 1996,  .
 Loftus, Elizabeth and Ketcham, Katherine. The Myth of Repressed Memory: False Memories and Allegations of Sexual Abuse. St. Martin's Griffin 1st edition, 1996.
 Lilienfeld, Scott. "Psychological treatments that cause harm." Perspectives on Psychological Science, Volume 2(1), pp. 53–70, 2007.
 
 
 Pendergrast, Mark, Victims of Memory (1993),

External links 
 
 Answers to questions about recovered memory by the American Psychological Association

Memory
Psychotherapies
Hypnosis
Pseudoscience